Park Ji-hoon (born May 29, 1999) is a South Korean singer and actor. He was initially active as a child actor and advertisement model. Park rose to fame in early 2017 as the second-place winner of the second season of the reality competition series Produce 101. He is a former member of the show's resulting boy group Wanna One and is currently active as a solo artist and actor.

Park began his solo career with his first fan-meet tour and EP O'Clock, following the end of Wanna One's activities as a group. He also resumed his acting career and known for his roles in Flower Crew: Joseon Marriage Agency (2019), Love Revolution (2020), At a Distance, Spring Is Green (2021), and Weak Hero Class 1 (2022). Park has remained active in variety and reality television shows and has also ventured into being a Radio DJ. He has also been the advertisement model for several brands across skincare, cosmetics, and food.

Early life and education 
Park Ji-hoon was born on May 29, 1999, in Masan Province in South Korea. Although he comes from Gyeongsang Province, Park has lived in Seoul since he was seven years old. He graduated from National Middle School of Traditional Arts, where he majored in musical theatre. Park majored in broadcasting arts at School of Performing Arts Seoul and graduated in January 2018. Park was accepted into Chung-Ang University’s Department of Theater for 2018.

Career

2006–2016: Career beginnings
Park debuted as a child actor, participating in musicals like Peter Pan (2007–2009), The Harmonium in My Memory (2010), and Radio Star (2010–2011), and small stints in television dramas Jumong (2006–2007), The King and I (2007–2008), Kimchi Cheese Smile (2007–2008), Iljimae (2008), and more. Park also appeared in SS501's reality show SS501 SOS (2006), although his face was blurred out through the episodes. In 2007, he appeared in KM Idol War with Big Bang. During his childhood, he continued to be active in musical theatre, television broadcasts, and film, and also worked as an advertisement model.

Less active in the entertainment industry in his teen years, Park began training to become an idol singer under SM Entertainment and Fantagio. Due to a knee injury, he did not make it to the final line up of Fantagio's boy group Astro and subsequently transferred to Maroo Entertainment.

2017–2018: Produce 101 and Wanna One

In 2017, Park represented Maroo Entertainment in the second season of Produce 101. He experienced a sudden rise in popularity after going viral as "wink boy (ko: 윙크남)", after the introductory "It's Me (Pick Me)" stage on M Countdown, even before the show had started airing. Consequently, Park's participation in the survival show received extensive media attention to the extent that his self-made aegyo catchphrase "save you in my heart (ko: 내 마음 속에 저장)" trended on social media and was used by various companies for marketing purposes. The phrase was later crowned as the best catchphrase of 2017 by KOCCA. Furthermore, Park received offers from various companies to become their advertisement model while the show was still being aired, and it was later revealed that Park had signed an exclusive contract with Maroo Entertainment before the show had started. He finished second, which made him a member of the project boy group Wanna One under YMC Entertainment. Wanna One disbanded on December 31, 2018, and officially completed activities after their sold out 4-day final concert series 'Therefore' that ran from January 24 to 27 at Gocheok Sky Dome.

2019: Solo Debut, First Asia Tour, and Return to Acting
After Wanna One's disbandment on December 31, 2018, Park Jihoon started his solo career with Maroo Entertainment and he held his first ever fanmeeting 'PARK JIHOON 2019 ASIA FAN MEETING [FIRST EDITION]' on February 9 at Kyunghee University Grand Peace Palace in Seoul, followed by fanmeets in Taipei (March 2), Thailand (March 9), Philippines (March 15), Hong Kong (March 23), Macau (March 30) and Japan (April 10).

On March 26, Park released his debut EP as a soloist, O'Clock, with the lead single "L.O.V.E". Park Jihoon took his first-ever solo music show win with his debut album "L.O.V.E" on KBS Music Bank on April 5, 2019. The same month, Park was cast in JTBC's historical drama Flower Crew: Joseon Marriage Agency, which was aired on September 16. Park received praise for his great acting skills and got many positive reviews for his first drama since the start of his career as a soloist. Park Jihoon, topping the list, ranked No. 1 in drama cast hot topic for 8 consecutive weeks (Good Data – Drama Actors Category and Racoi ranking) on his Flower Crew drama airing (2 months).

In December 2019, Park Jihoon kicked off his solo fan-meeting tour, titled "FANCON ASIA TOUR". Beginning in South Korea, the tour was set to span cities in several countries including Seoul, Hyogo & Tokyo, Macau, Bangkok, Taipei and Jakarta.

On December 4, Park released his second EP, 360, and its lead single of the same name.

2020: Love Revolution, 1st Studio Album, and First Solo Concert
Park returned with his third EP, The W, with the title track "Wing", on May 26. Park Jihoon made several appearances on radio shows for his 'The W' promotion including Cool FM KBS Radio Show, SBS Cultwo Radio Show, Noon Hope Radio Show and Sung Woon Late Night Radio Show.

Park Jihoon took his first lead role in the Kakao M's web drama Love Revolution, an adaptation of the popular webtoon of the same name. The drama aired from September 1 to December 27, 2020. The first episode of Love Revolution surpassed a million views in one day on KakaoTV and was No. 1 on the Top 10 weekly videos. The first five episodes have also achieved the million milestone. Park's popularity rose with viewers and critics praising his acting skills. The song "Midnight" was recorded and released by Park Jihoon as part of the drama's soundtrack.

On November 4, Park released his first studio album, Message, with the title track "Gotcha".

Park Jihoon held his first ever online solo concert titled "Message" on December 13.

2021-present: Continued acting and singing activities, and Weak Hero: Class One

Park starred in the lead role of the KBS college drama At a Distance, Spring is Green which aired from June 14th thru July 2021.

On August 12, Park released his fourth EP My Collection, with the title track "Gallery".

On October 28, Park released his fifth EP Hot&Cold, with the title track "Serious".

On June 26, Park held '2022 Park Ji-hoon Special Fanmeeting in Thailand', a fanmeeting in Thailand, and his first in three years. In July 2022, Park announced that he would be holding '2022 Park Ji-hoon Special Fan Meeting in Japan' on August 18 and 20 in Tokyo and Kobe Japan.

In August 2022, it was announced that Park would be making a comeback with his sixth EP The Answer with the title track "Nitro" on October 12, 2022. On September 30, he pre-released a b-side called "Moon & Back".

On October 9th and 10th, Park held a two-day concert called '[CLUE]' at the YES24 Live Hall.

Park starred in the lead role of the wavve k-drama Weak Hero Class 1 which premiered on November 18th. Before its premiere, the first three episodes of the drama were screened at the 27th Busan International Film Festival where it sold out in two minutes, leading to additional screenings. The drama became an overnight hit immediately becoming wavve's #1 drama in paid subscribers within the first day. Weak Hero was a critical as well as a commercial success garnering a 9.9 rating overseas and glowing reviews from critics. It also ranked #1 on the OTT integrated search and recommendation site Kinolights. Park received overwhelming praise from both critics and online communities for his portrayal of Yeon Si-eun, with some of his highlight scenes going viral on various social media sites such as Tik-Tok and Twitter. The role has been called a "rediscovery of Park Ji-hoon" as the idol singer's cute and bubbly image was nowhere to be found in his performance. When asked about the casting of Park, creative director Han Jun-hee revealed that shortcake (the production company) CEO Lee Myung-jin originally suggested the idol actor for the role after being amazed with his performance in At a Distance, Spring Is Green. After reviewing his older work and interviews, he was convinced and the suggestion was passed along to director Yu Su-min.

On December 9th, it was announced that Park would star alongside veteran actress Kim Jung-nan in his first movie, Audrey. It is expected to be released in 2023.

Discography

Studio albums

Extended plays

Singles

As lead artist

Other releases

Filmography

Film

Television series

Web series

Television shows

Radio shows

Theatre 
 Peter Pan (2007–2009)
 The Harmonium in My Memory (2010)
 Radio Star (2010–2011)
 A Midsummer Night's Dream (2014)

Other ventures

Endorsements and promotions 
In April 2018, Park was appointed for his first ever solo endorsement deal as a model for April Skin. He would endorse their Milk Booster Fast Shampoo as well as a collection of hair-dyes. A special event was held where customers would receive an exclusive bromide when purchasing April Skin hair products over 15,000 won.

Park along with fellow Wanna One member Ong Seong-wu was selected as a model for CLAVIS and their line of sports bracelets on April 20, 2018.

In March 2019, the seaweed snack brand Masita revealed Park as the new ambassador for their new "0% MSG" recipe that came in five different flavors.

The same month, March 2019, Park and fellow former Wanna One member Bae Jin-young were selected as the new advertising models for youth make-up brand, I'M MEME.

In May 2019, it was announced that Park had been selected as the new exclusive model for pizza specialty brand, Pizza E-Tang. He would promote their new pizza flavor, Shinsegae Pizza 2. He would also film his first solo commercial. The promotion was a success with the pizza consistently selling out.

On May 3, 2019, Yuyu Nature selected Park as an exclusive model for their flagship health supplement, Formoline L112.

Park was selected as the advertisement model for Oppa-dak Chicken in June 2019. Oppa-dak Chicken is a chicken franchise under the E-Tang company.

In June 2020, Park had his first apparel collaboration with contemporary fashion brand [LE] MOHO. The collection was named "[LA] POMME de Universe" in which Park participated in the design. To emphasize Park's mysteriousness, the collection's image was of infinity in the universe and also featured a green apple to reflect the refreshing image of a young man in his twenties. A portion of the sales of this project was donated to charities and organizations participating in the fight against COVID-19.

In October 2020, Park collaborated with Tous on the 'Toss Love Me' perfume that was made to commemorate the 100th anniversary of the brand's founding. 'Toss Love Me' became a bestseller and sold out at the Olive Young Myeong-dong Store where it was carried domestically.

On August 18, 2021, it was announced that Park had been selected as an exclusive model for the Korean skincare and cosmetics brand, It's Skin. He would model for them both domestically and overseas in Japan and Southeast Asia.

Awards and nominations

Notes

References

External links
 
 
 
 

1999 births
Living people
People from Changwon
South Korean male child actors
Swing Entertainment artists
Produce 101 contestants
South Korean television personalities
South Korean male idols
South Korean pop singers
South Korean male singers
South Korean male web series actors
21st-century South Korean singers
School of Performing Arts Seoul alumni
Wanna One members
Reality show winners